Eupithecia nigripennis is a moth in the  family Geometridae. It is found in Peru.

The wingspan is about 14 mm. The forewings are dark flesh-coloured, except at the costa, where they are darkened with brownish. The hindwings are purplish black, crossed by five or six lines.

References

Moths described in 1907
nigripennis
Moths of South America